Tomáš Kaplan (born 3 April 1978) is a Czech former professional footballer. He made 36 appearances in the Gambrinus liga, playing for Vysočina Jihlava and Příbram.

Kaplan finished as joint-top scorer in the 2003–04 Czech 2. Liga, scoring 10 goals.

References

External links
 
 Profile at FC Vysočina Jihlava website 
 

1978 births
Living people
Czech footballers
Czech First League players
FC Vysočina Jihlava players
1. FK Příbram players
Slovak Super Liga players
1. FC Tatran Prešov players
Czech expatriate footballers
Expatriate footballers in Slovakia
Czech expatriate sportspeople in Slovakia
Association football forwards
Sportspeople from Jihlava